Thaskaraveeran is a 1957 Indian Malayalam-language film, directed and produced by Shri Ramulu Naidu. The film stars Sathyan and Ragini. The film had musical score by C. Ramchandra and S. M. Subbaiah Naidu. The movie was a remake of the director's own 1954 Tamil movie Malaikkallan.

Cast
 Sathyan as Kumar/Maayavi/Khan Sahib
 Ragini as Shobha
 Thikkurissy Sukumaran Nair as Police Officer
 Kedamangalam Sadanandan as Thampi
 P. A. Thomas as Vikraman
 Aranmula Ponnamma as Saraswathi
 Kanchana as Parvathy
Kottarakkara Sreedharan Nair as Vijayan
 Kundara Bhasi as Panikkar
 S. P. Pillai as Pappu Pilla/441
 Priyadarsini
 Sukumari (Debut) as Janaki

Soundtrack

References

External links
 

1957 films
1950s Malayalam-language films
Malayalam remakes of Tamil films
Films directed by S. M. Sriramulu Naidu